Buffalo Gap is a community in Rural Municipality of Hart Butte No. 11 in Division No. 3 in Saskatchewan

Hart Butte No. 11, Saskatchewan
Unincorporated communities in Saskatchewan
Division No. 3, Saskatchewan